DS3, DS-3, or DS 3 may refer to:

Science and technology
 (29823) 1999 DS3, a main-belt minor planet
 Digital Signal 3, a digital signal level 3 T-carrier

Transportation
 DS3 (locomotive), an AC electric locomotive
 DS 3, a French supermini car
 Citroën DS3 WRC, a French WRC rally car
 DS 3 Crossback, a French subcompact crossover

Video games

Games
 Dark Souls III, a 2016 video game
 Darksiders III, a 2018 video game
 Darkstalkers 3, a 1997 video game
 Dead Space 3, a 2013 video game
 Dungeon Siege III, a 2011 video game

Consoles
 DualShock 3, a gamepad by Sony for the PlayStation 3

Other uses
 Army Wounded Warrior Program, a program formerly known as Disabled Soldier Support System (DS3)

See also
 Nintendo 3DS, a handheld game console
 3DS (disambiguation)
  Drip Season 3 an album by Gunna